Strayed can refer to:

 Cheryl Strayed, American author who adopted the surname Strayed before events depicted in her book Wild: From Lost to Found on the Pacific Crest Trail
 Strayed (2003 film), a 2003 French film directed by André Téchiné
 Strayed (2009 film), a 2009 Kazakhstani film directed by Akan Satayev
 Strayed (song), a 2000 song by the band Smog